St. Stephen's Church, Sneinton is a parish church in the Church of England.

The church is Grade II listed by the Department for Digital, Culture, Media and Sport as it is a building of special architectural or historic interest. The parents of D.H. Lawrence married in the church on 27 December 1875.

History

The church dates back to medieval times, and was served from Lenton Priory. From the Dissolution of the Monasteries the church was served mostly by clergy from St. Mary's Church, Nottingham until it became a parish is its own right in 1866.

The current building dates from 1837 and it was designed by Thomas Rickman and built by W. Surplice of Nottingham. It was one of the earliest Gothic Revival buildings in Nottinghamshire.  It is a Commissioners' church, having been given a grant towards the cost of its construction by the Church Building Commission; the full cost of the church was £4,511 (equivalent to £ in ), towards which the Commission granted £1,303. The clock was installed by Reuben Bosworth.

The church's early catholic liturgy was noted by Wylie in 1853, and it was the first church in Nottingham to introduce a surpliced choir - There is a male choir, the members of which are dressed in surplices. This is the only Protestant place of worship in the neighbourhood where this and other kindred practices, such as intoning the prayers, prevail.. Compare this with nearby St Mary's Church, Nottingham which did not introduce surplices for the choir until 1868

The church was extended between 1909 and 1912 and Cecil Greenwood Hare to designs by George Frederick Bodley.

Following the closure of St. Matthias' Church, Nottingham in 2003 the parish is now known as St. Stephen and St. Matthias.

Features

The reredos to the high altar was designed by George Frederick Bodley and carved in Oberammergau. It features scenes from the life of Christ.

The choir stalls date from the fourteenth or fifteenth century and were originally from St. Mary's Church, Nottingham. They were acquired by the organist of St. Stephen's in 1848. They contain fine medieval misericords which have carved figures.

Incumbents

Pathe News
The church featured in a 1959 British Pathe newsreel, which showed Reverend John Tyson, the local vicar, encouraging young people back to church. They helped with the cleaning, attended evening service and in return were able to build a cafe and rock 'n' roll club in the vicarage.

Organ
The small pipe organ obtained in 1840 was sold in 1871 to St Giles Church, West Bridgford. The church replaced this at a cost of £450 with an organ by Brindley & Foster in 1872. The organ was dedicated at Harvest Festival on 19 September 1872 when it was played by Herbert Stephen Irons, Rector Chori and Organist of Southwell Minster.

This organ was enlarged in 1888. Further work was carried out by Cousans and Sons in 1901 when it was moved from the chancel and rebuilt. Later Ernest Wragg and Sons undertook further work.

Organists
William Henry Willcockson ???? - 1848
Thomas Smith 1848 - 1864
W.F. Horners ca. 1881
Charles F.C  Hole 1882 - ????
H.G. Hamilton 1903 - ????
Jabez Hack ca. 1920 - 1941

References

External links
Parish website for St Stephens with St Matthias

Sneinton Saint Stephen
Sneinton
Churches completed in 1837
19th-century Church of England church buildings
Sneinton Saint Stephen
Commissioners' church buildings
Thomas Rickman buildings
Sneiton